"Touch Me, Tease Me" is a 1996 song by American R&B singer and songwriter Case. It serves as the second single from his self-titled debut album (1996). It features vocals from R&B singer Mary J. Blige and rapper Foxy Brown, with backing vocals by Vernell Foster (later known as Vee of Koffee Brown) and contains a sample of the 1985 song "P.S.K. (What Does It Mean?)" by Schooly D.

The single was commercially successful, peaking at number 14 on the US Billboard Hot 100, and number 26 on the UK Official Charts. The song also placed at number 63 on the Billboard Year-End Hot 100 singles of 1996, and was Certified Gold by the Recording Industry Association of America.

The song also features in the soundtrack to the Eddie Murphy film The Nutty Professor, which scenes are intercut in its music video. Blige and Brown make appearances in the video.

Samples and covers
In 1996 hip hop group The LOX freestyled over the instrumental to "Touch Me, Tease Me" on Hot 97.

The song was later covered by Welsh boyband 3SL in 2002 and reached number 16 on the UK Singles Chart, ten places higher than the original.

In 2009 50 Cent recorded an abbreviated version titled "Touch Me". In its music video, he is seen wearing the same attire as Case in the original version.

In 2018 King Combs (son of Sean "Diddy" Combs) sampled "Touch Me, Tease Me" for his single "Love You Better" featuring vocals from Chris Brown.

References

Case (singer) songs
1996 singles
2002 singles
Def Jam Recordings singles
Hip hop soul songs
Songs written by Mary J. Blige
Songs written by Foxy Brown (rapper)
1996 songs
Songs written by Stevie J